Patrick A. O'Donnell (21 August 1907 – 4 October 1970) was an Irish Fine Gael politician and Teachta Dála (TD) for over twenty years.

He was born on 21 August 1907 in County Meath to James F. O'Donnell, a hotelier, of Burtonport, County Donegal, and Bridget O'Donnell (née McDonnell). Raised in Burtonport, O'Donnell was educated at national schools in Meenmore and Meenamara, and at St Eunan's College in Letterkenny.

He studied for a time at University College Dublin, and qualified as a solicitor in 1930, serving his apprenticeship with a firm in Ballybofey, County Donegal. He established his own practice in Dungloe, which became one of the largest and most successful in Ireland, with extensive business throughout counties Donegal, Sligo, and Leitrim.

While Minister for Local Government, attended the St Eunan's College Golden Jubilee there in September 1956. He was a member of Donegal County Council from 1959 to 1970.

He was first elected to Dáil Éireann on 16 November 1949 for the Donegal West constituency, in a by-election caused by the death of Fianna Fáil TD Brian Brady. He was re-elected at the 1951 general election and retained his Dáil seat until his death in 1970. O'Donnell was also a member of cabinet, serving as Minister for Local Government in the Second Inter-Party Government under Taoiseach John A. Costello. He was the first Donegal deputy ever to serve in cabinet.

References

 

1907 births
1970 deaths
Fine Gael TDs
Members of the 13th Dáil
Members of the 14th Dáil
Members of the 15th Dáil
Members of the 16th Dáil
Members of the 17th Dáil
Members of the 18th Dáil
Members of the 19th Dáil
Irish solicitors
Alumni of University College Dublin
People educated at St Eunan's College
Politicians from County Donegal